Wilson Ko Chun (born 17 February 1998) is a Hong Kong professional footballer who currently plays for Hong Kong Premier League club Lee Man.

Career statistics

Club

Notes

References

Living people
1998 births
Hong Kong footballers
Association football goalkeepers
Hong Kong Premier League players
Yuen Long FC players
TSW Pegasus FC players
Lee Man FC players